Lottia dorsuosa is a species of limpet in the family Lottiidae. It is known commonly as the bumpy limpet. It is native to the northwestern Pacific, occurring along the coasts of Japan, Korea, and Taiwan.

References

External links
Bouchet, P. (2015). Lottia dorsuosa (Gould, 1859). In: MolluscaBase (2015). Accessed through: World Register of Marine Species.

Lottiidae
Gastropods described in 1859